Dinko Trebotić (born 30 July 1990) is a Croatian professional footballer who plays as a midfielder for Gloria Buzău.

Career
A product of the Hajduk Split academy, Trebotić had his professional debut for the club in the 2008–09 season on 5 October 2008 against Croatia Sesvete under manager Goran Vučević. However, fe failed to impress and it proved to be his only league appearance of the season, as he was loaned to second-tier sides Junak Sinj and Rudeš. After returning from loan in July 2010, Trebotić joined Hajduk's first team for the 2010–11 season and was made a regular in the starting squad under manager Stanko Poklepović. In February 2012, he joined Zagreb on loan for the rest of the 2011–12 season.

After having his contract with Hajdu terminated in August 2012, Trebotić joined Lokomotiva. After two seasons with Lokomotiva, which yielded seven goals and seven assists in 57 matches in all competitions, Trebotić departed Croatia to join Nemzeti Bajnokság I club Videoton, where he signed a four-year deal. His two years with Videoton saw him manage four goals and four assists in 45 matches in all competitions.

In July 2016, Trebotić signed three-year deal with Israeli side Bnei Yehuda. After Bnei Yehuda, he also played for Fredrikstad, Slaven Belupo, Dinamo Minsk and was sent on a loan from Dinamo Minsk to Kaposvár.

On 6 August 2020, Trebotić signed a two-year contract with Bosnian Premier League club Zrinjski Mostar. He made his official debut for Zrinjski on 12 August 2020 in a league match against Radnik Bijeljina. Trebotić scored his first goal for Zrinjski in a league match against Krupa on 28 September 2020. He left Zrinjski in June 2021.

Honours
Videoton
Nemzeti Bajnokság I: 2014–15

References

External links
 
Dinko Trebotić at Football Lineups

1990 births
Living people
Footballers from Split, Croatia
Association football midfielders
Croatian footballers
Croatia under-21 international footballers
HNK Hajduk Split players
NK Junak Sinj players
NK Rudeš players
NK Zagreb players
NK Lokomotiva Zagreb players
Fehérvár FC players
Bnei Yehuda Tel Aviv F.C. players
Fredrikstad FK players
NK Slaven Belupo players
FC Dinamo Minsk players
Kaposvári Rákóczi FC players
HŠK Zrinjski Mostar players
Águilas CF players
FC Gloria Buzău players
Croatian Football League players
Nemzeti Bajnokság I players
Israeli Premier League players
Norwegian First Division players
Belarusian Premier League players
Premier League of Bosnia and Herzegovina players
Segunda Federación players
Liga II players
Croatian expatriate footballers
Expatriate footballers in Hungary
Expatriate footballers in Israel
Expatriate footballers in Norway
Expatriate footballers in Belarus
Expatriate footballers in Bosnia and Herzegovina
Expatriate footballers in Spain
Expatriate footballers in Romania
Croatian expatriate sportspeople in Hungary
Croatian expatriate sportspeople in Israel
Croatian expatriate sportspeople in Norway
Croatian expatriate sportspeople in Belarus
Croatian expatriate sportspeople in Bosnia and Herzegovina
Croatian expatriate sportspeople in Spain
Croatian expatriate sportspeople in Romania